The Il mestiere della vita Tour 2017 was a concert tour by Italian singer-songwriter Tiziano Ferro in promotion of his sixth studio album Il mestiere della vita.

The news of the new tour will be announced on October 6, 2016 through the official Facebook profile of the artist, while on December 1 a new double date will be announced in Rome. On January 30 a third date was announced in Milan, while on February 23 a new double date in Bari.

Due to this tour, Il mestiere della vita Tour 2017 in April 2018, the singer and composer won an Onstage Award for the best Italian tour.

Band
 Davide Tagliapietra: Guitarist
 Luca Scarpa: Pianist
 Reggie Hamilton: Bassist
 Nicola Peruch: Keyboardist
 Alessandro De Crescenzo: Guitarist
 Andrea Fontana: Drummer

Setlist
"Il mestiere della vita"
"Epic"
""Solo" è solo una parola"
"L'amore è una cosa semplice"
"Valore assoluto"
"Il regalo più grande"
"R&B Medley": My Steelo, Hai delle isole negli occhi, Indietro
"La differenza tra me e te"
"Ed ero contentissimo"
"Sere nere"
"Xdono"
"Encore"
"Medley Electro Dance": Il sole esiste per tutti, Senza scappare mai più, E Raffaella è mia
"Ti scatterò una foto"
"Acoustic Medley: Imbranato, Troppo buono, E fuori è buio (only guitar)"
"Per dirti ciao!"
"La fine"
"Encore"
"Lento/Veloce"
"Rosso relativo"
"Stop! Dimentica"
"Xverso"
"Alla mia età"
"L'ultima notte al mondo"
"Encore": Mi sono innamorato di te (only piano)
"Incanto"
"Lo stadio"
"Il conforto"
"Non me lo so spiegare"
"Potremmo ritornare"

Tour dates

References

2017 concert tours
Concert tours of Europe
Tiziano Ferro